Harlington is a village in the civil parish of Barnburgh in the Metropolitan Borough of Doncaster in South Yorkshire, England. The village lies less than a mile from the adjoining village of Barnburgh and the parish contains both villages. According to the 2001 census, Harlington had a population of 1,979, increasing to 2,297 at the 2011 Census.

Rachael Wooding, a performer in the musical theatre who toured in the title role of Evita in 2009, was born in Harlington.

See also
Listed buildings in Barnburgh

References

External links

 Barnburgh and Harlington

Villages in Doncaster